is a Japanese name meaning "fortunate" or sometimes "one who is from the Fukui prefecture". It may refer to:

Places 
 Fukui Domain, a part of the Japanese han system during the Edo period
 Fukui Prefecture, a prefecture of Japan located in the Chūbu region on Honshū island
 Fukui (city), the capital city of the prefecture
 Fukui Station (Fukui), the main train station of the city of Fukui

People 
Fukui (surname)

Others 
1948 Fukui earthquake, a magnitude 7.1 earthquake which struck Fukui prefecture in 1948
6924 Fukui, an Outer Main-belt asteroid

See also
 Fugui (disambiguation)
 Fukui Station (disambiguation)